The Costa Rica men's national volleyball team represents Costa Rica in international volleyball competitions and friendly matches. 

The team is currently ranked 48 in the world. It is governed by the Federación Costarricense de Voleibol (Costa Rican Federation of Volleyball) and takes part in international volleyball competitions. Costa Rica has multiple championships in the Centroamerican area organized by the AFECAVOL.

Team

Current squad 
The following is the 2016-2017 national team shortlist for the NORCECA championship, Panamerican Cup, WCQT and the Centroamerican Games in 2017.

Head Coach: Juan Acuña

References

 FECOVOL (Costarican Volleyball Federation
 NORCECA

National sports teams of Costa Rica
National men's volleyball teams
Men's sport in Costa Rica
Volleyball in Costa Rica